Jacob Murrell (born June 22, 2004) is an American college soccer player who currently plays for Georgetown University. Murrell is the 2022 recipient of the Gatorade Player of the Year for Boys' Soccer, a national recognition for the top boys high school soccer player in the United States.

Career

Youth and college 
Murrell was born and raised in Forest Hill, Maryland which is the northeastern part of the Baltimore metropolitan area. He played high school soccer for all four of his seasons at the McDonogh School, a private school near Owings Mills, Maryland. Throughout his high school years, Murrell was used a versatile, utility player, playing multiple positions, before transitioning to forward his junior and senior years. Murrell played as a midfielder his freshman season and as a defender his sophomore year. Murrell had a breakout season his senior year, scoring 41 goals and providing 20 assists in 24 games, helping McDonogh finish the season with a 21–3–0 record. There, he helped McDonogh reach the A Conference championship, where they lost to Calvert Hall in the MIAA Conference A Championship.

In June 2022, Murrell was selected as the boys' soccer winner for the Gatorade National Player of the Year Award. 

Ahead of the 2022 NCAA Division I men's soccer season, Murrell committed to playing college soccer for Georgetown, turning town offers from Maryland, Penn, and American.

Reference

External links 
 Jacob Murrell at Georgetown University Athletics

2004 births
Living people
American soccer players
Association football forwards
Georgetown Hoyas men's soccer players
People from Harford County, Maryland
Soccer players from Maryland